Korona Radio 1 or Korona Radio is a Bosnian local commercial radio station, broadcasting from Trebinje, Bosnia and Herzegovina.

This radio station broadcasts a variety of programs such as pop-rock music with local news. The owner of the radio station is the company Korona d.o.o. Trebinje.

Korona Radio was launched on 8 March 2000. Since 2018, the second radio station program Korona Radio 2 has been launched, which mainly broadcasts folk or popular regional music.

The program is mainly produced in Serbian at one FM frequency (Trebinje ) and it is available in the city of Trebinje as well as in nearby municipalities of East Herzegovina and in neighboring Montenegro and Croatia.

Estimated number of listeners of Korona Radio 1 is around 37.825.

Frequencies
 Trebinje

See also 
 List of radio stations in Bosnia and Herzegovina
 Korona Radio 2
 Radio Trebinje
 Radio Bileća
 Radio Nevesinje
 Radio Gacko
 Radio Padrino

References

External links 
 www.koronaonline.com
 www.radiostanica.ba
 www.fmscan.org
 Communications Regulatory Agency of Bosnia and Herzegovina

Trebinje
Radio stations established in 2000
Trebinje